Refuge de Platé is a refuge located on the "Tour des Fiz", in Haute Savoie, facing Mont Blanc in the Alps.

Mountain huts in the Alps
Mountain huts in France